The Alvin W. Vogtle Electric Generating Plant, also known as Plant Vogtle, is a four-unit nuclear power plant located in Burke County, near Waynesboro, Georgia, in the southeastern United States. On March 6, 2023, Vogtle Unit 3 reached initial criticality for the first time.

It is named after a former Alabama Power and Southern Company board chairman, Alvin Vogtle.

Each unit is a Westinghouse pressurized water reactor (PWR), with a General Electric steam turbine and electric generator. 
Units 1 and 2 were completed in 1987 and 1989, respectively. 
Each unit has a gross electricity generation capacity of 1,215 MW, for a combined capacity of 2,430 MW. 
Four smaller mechanical draft cooling towers provide nuclear service cooling water (NSCW) to safety and auxiliary non-safety components, as well as remove the decay heat from the reactor when the plant is offline. 
One natural-draft tower and two NSCW towers serve each unit. 
In 2009, the Nuclear Regulatory Commission (NRC) renewed the licenses for both units for an additional 20 years to 1/16/2047 for Unit 1, and 2/9/2049 for Unit 2. During the construction of Vogtle's first two units, capital investment required jumped from an estimated $660 million to $8.87 billion. ($ in  dollars)

Two additional units utilizing Westinghouse AP1000 reactors have been under construction since 2009. 
The units have suffered several delays and cost overruns. 
The certified construction & capital costs for these two new units were originally $14 billion, according to the Seventeenth Semi-annual Vogtle Construction Monitoring Report in 2017.
This last report blames the latest increase of costs on the contractor not completing work as scheduled. 
Another complicating factor in the construction process is the bankruptcy of Westinghouse in 2017.
In 2018 costs were estimated to be about $25 billion. By 2021 they were estimated to be over $28.5 billion.
Upon completion of Units 3 and 4 in 2023, Vogtle will become the largest nuclear power station in the United States.

Units 1 and 2

Vogtle units 1 and 2 are a set of identical Westinghouse 4-Loop reactors. Like many North American nuclear power stations, each of the Vogtle units are constructed of a steel-lined, prestressed, post-tensioned
concrete cylinder with a hemispherical dome. The containment was designed by the Los Angeles Regional Office of the Bechtel Power Corporation.

Power Uprate

In 2008, reactors 1 and 2 were increased in power by 1.7% by an "Appendix K" uprate, also called a Measurement Uncertainty Recapture (MUR) uprate. Measurement uncertainty recapture power uprates are less than 2 percent, and are achieved by implementing enhanced techniques for calculating reactor power. This involves the use of state-of-the-art feedwater flow measurement devices to more precisely measure feedwater flow, which is used to calculate reactor power. More precise measurements reduce the degree of uncertainty in the power level, which is used by analysts to predict the ability of the reactor to be safely shut down under postulated accident conditions. Because the reactor power can now be calculated with much greater accuracy than with the old venturi type measurement, the plant can safely run within a tighter margin of error to its limits. The new flowmeter works by comparing the time it takes ultrasonic sound pulses to travel upstream versus downstream inside the pipe, and uses the time differential to figure the flow rate of the water in the pipe.

The NRC approved Vogtle's License Amendment Request (LAR) in March 2008. The NRC staff determined that Southern Nuclear could safely increase the reactor's power output primarily through more accurate means of measuring feedwater flow. NRC staff also reviewed Southern Nuclear's evaluations showing that the plant's design can handle the increased power level. Unit 1 was uprated during its Spring 2008 refueling outage, and Unit 2 was uprated in the Fall outage of the same year.

Electricity production

Loss of power incident
A loss of electrical power in the plant occurred on March 20, 1990.

At 9:20 a.m., a truck carrying fuel and lubricants in the plant's 230 kV switchyard backed into a support column for the feeder line supplying power to the Unit 1-A reserve auxiliary transformer (RAT). At the time, the 1-B RAT was de-energized for maintenance and RAT 1-A was powering both trains of emergency electrical power.  The non-emergency electrical trains were being powered by back-feeding from the switchyard through the main step-up transformer to the 1-A and 1-B unit auxiliary transformers (UAT). Additionally, emergency diesel generator (EDG) 1-B was out of service for planned maintenance. After the power loss, EDG 1-A failed to start due to a protective safety trip. The resulting loss of electrical power in the plant's "vital circuits" shut down the residual heat removal (RHR) pump that was cooling the core of Unit 1 (which was nearing the end of a refueling outage) and prevented the backup RHR from activating. Even though Unit 1 was offline at the time, residual heat from the natural decay of the radioactive fuel must be removed to prevent a dangerous rise in core temperature. While the non-safety power was not interrupted, there was no physical connection between the vital and non-vital electrical trains, preventing the vital trains from receiving power from the unaffected path through the UATs.

At 9:40 a.m., the plant operators declared a site area emergency (SAE) per existing procedures which called for an SAE whenever "vital" power is lost for more than 15 minutes. At 9:56 a.m., after trying multiple times to start the 1-A EDG normally, plant operators performed an emergency startup of the EDG by activating the generator's emergency start "break-glass" which bypassed most of the EDG's safeties and forced it to start. The startup was successful. RHR-A was then started using power from EDG-A. With core cooling restored, the SAE was downgraded to an alert at 10:15 a.m. At 11:40 a.m., crews energized RAT 1-B which had been shut down for maintenance, restoring power to the "B" safety electrical train. At 12:57 p.m., the "A" safety train was switched from the EDG to RAT 1-B and the EDG was shut down. With both trains receiving offsite power, the alert was terminated at 1:47 p.m.

Throughout the event, non-vital power was continuously available to Unit 1 from off-site sources. However, the Vogtle electrical system was not designed to permit easy interconnection of the Unit 1 vital busses to non-vital power or the Unit 2 electrical busses. Since this incident, Plant Vogtle has implemented changes to the plant that allow the non-vital electrical buses to transfer power to the vital buses in this type of scenario.

This electrical fault also affected Unit 2 by causing breakers in the 230 kV switchyard to trip, cutting off power to RAT 2-B and vital bus "B." EDG 2-B subsequently started and restored power to the vital bus. At the same time, the electrical disturbance from the falling line striking the ground was detected by protective safeties on the Unit 2 main step-up transformer and a protective relay actuated, opening the transformer's output breaker. This caused a full load rejection to Unit 2, leading to a turbine trip and subsequently, a reactor scram. After Unit 2 tripped, the "B" non-vital electrical train lost power as it attempted to transfer from UAT 2-B (powered by the turbine generator) to the failed RAT 2-B, causing two of the reactor coolant pumps and one of the main feedwater pumps to trip. Despite this, plant cool-down proceeded safely. At 9:03 p.m., the RAT 2-B breakers in the switchyard were reset and offsite power was restored to the vital and non-vital "B" electrical trains, allowing reactor coolant pumps 2 and 4 to be restarted. EDG 2-B was shutdown. It was later determined that the fault disturbance caused by the line falling was not of significant magnitude to trip the protective relay per design and should not have caused Unit 2 to shut down. Further investigation found that current transformers on the main transformer were improperly set. The controls were adjusted to the proper setting. Had the CTs been properly set initially, the Unit 2 would have remained online.

Units 3 and 4

Planning phase

On August 15, 2006, Southern Nuclear formally applied for an Early Site Permit (ESP) for two additional units, and on March 31, 2008, submitted an application for a Combined Construction and Operating License (COL). 
On April 9, 2008, Georgia Power Company reached a contract agreement for two AP1000 reactors designed by Westinghouse; owned by Toshiba. 
Westinghouse partnered with the Shaw Group (Baton Rouge, LA) and its Stone & Webster division to manage the project with Westinghouse responsible for engineering, design, and overall management, and Shaw responsible for manufacturing the pre-fabricated component modules and managing the on-site construction. 
The contract represented the first agreement for new nuclear development in the United States since the Three Mile Island accident in 1979, and it received approval from the Georgia Public Service Commission on March 17, 2009.

Construction
On August 26, 2009, the Nuclear Regulatory Commission (NRC) issued an Early Site Permit and a Limited Work Authorization. 
Limited construction at the new reactor sites began, with Unit 3 then expected to be operational in 2016, followed by Unit 4 in 2017, pending final issuance of the Combined Construction and Operating License by the NRC.

In December 2011, a 19th revision was written for the AP1000 Design Certification, which effectively included a complete redesign of the containment building:The wall is appropriately reinforced and sized where the composite wall module joins the reinforced concrete sections and as appropriate to accommodate seismic loads and aircraft loads. This design is new to the amendment; previously the structure was all reinforced concrete. [emphasis added]As this change to the design requirements was made after engineering contracts were already signed and manufacturing had begun on the reactor's long-lead-time components, it resulted in a halting of construction as the containment building had to be re-designed.
The operational dates have since slipped to 2022 and 2023 for Units 3 and 4, respectively.

On February 16, 2010, President Barack Obama announced $8.33 billion in federal loan guarantees toward the construction cost, although as of December 2013, Georgia Power had not availed itself of those guarantees, at first awaiting the construction license, and after the construction stop lawsuit outcome.
The expected building cost for the two reactors was $14 billion. 
Georgia power's share was around $6.1 billion, while remaining ownership of the two reactors is split among Oglethorpe Power Corp., the Municipal Electric Authority of Georgia (MEAG Power), and Dalton Utilities.

In February 2012, the NRC approved the construction license of the two proposed AP1000 reactors at Vogtle. NRC Chairman Gregory Jaczko cast the lone dissenting vote on plans to build and operate the two new nuclear power reactors, citing safety concerns stemming from Japan's 2011 Fukushima nuclear disaster, saying, "I cannot support issuing this license as if Fukushima never happened." One week after Southern Company received the license to begin construction, many environmental and anti-nuclear groups sued to stop the expansion project, claiming "public safety and environmental problems since Japan's Fukushima-Daiichi nuclear reactor accident have not been taken into account". On July 11, 2012, the lawsuit was rejected by the Washington D.C. Circuit Court of Appeals.

In February 2013, the project's construction contractor, Shaw, was purchased by Chicago Bridge & Iron Company (CB&I). On March 12, 2013, construction on Unit 3 officially began with the pour of the basemat concrete for the nuclear island. This operation was completed on March 14. During the weekend of June 1, 2013, assembly of the containment vessel began with the bottom head of the vessel being lifted into place on the nuclear island. By June 2013, the construction schedule had been extended by at least 14 months. On November 21, 2013, the basemat pour for Unit 4 was completed.

In February 2014, the Department of Energy approved a $6.5 billion loan guarantee for Southern Company subsidiary Georgia Power and Oglethorpe Power Corp.  The Department of Energy initially demanded a credit subsidy fee, but the demand was ultimately dropped given the financial strength of Southern Co. and the Vogtle project.

Further delays and cost increases were incorporated in a revised schedule in early 2015. As a result of the increased delays and cost overruns, contractor CB&I exited the project and Westinghouse took direct control of the project as contractor and hired construction firm Fluor to replace CB&I/Shaw on-site managing the day-to-day work. Westinghouse purchased certain assets of the former Shaw Group from CB&I to allow the project to go forward. In 2016, Southern Company and Westinghouse added construction firm Bechtel to the project to share construction management responsibilities.

Recent construction milestones include setting the final of the "big six" structural modules for Unit 3 (CA-02 and CA-03, which form the walls of a storage tank that is part of the reactor's passive cooling system). The "big six" modules also include the previously installed CA-01, CA-04, and CA-05 in-containment structural modules, as well as the previously installed CA-20 structural module which forms part of the internal structure of the auxiliary building, containing many of the reactor's support systems. CA-02 and CA-03 were placed within the containment vessel in May 2016. The setting of these modules is a fairly significant milestone and allows other construction activities to commence. In June 2016, the final reactor coolant pump for Unit 3 was received on site. In November 2016, the reactor vessel for Unit 3 was set within the nuclear island. 2017 progress includes the installation of the reactor coolant loop piping and both steam generators at Unit 3. Progress has also been made in the turbine, auxiliary, and annex building. Unit 4 has also seen progress with the installation of the final two "big six" structural modules.

Westinghouse bankruptcy 2017
In March 2017, Westinghouse Electric Company filed for Chapter 11 bankruptcy due to losses from its two U.S. nuclear construction projects. The U.S. government has given $8.3 billion of loan guarantees to help finance construction of the Vogtle reactors, and a way forward to completing the plant has been agreed upon. On July 31, 2017 Southern Company division, Southern Nuclear, officially took over construction from Westinghouse and opened a bid for a new construction management contract to manage the day-to-day work on the site. Southern received bids from Fluor and Bechtel. On August 31, 2017, Southern announced its decision to move forward with Bechtel to be the day-to-day construction manager for the remainder of the project. Bechtel will replace Fluor, who will no longer be involved in the project.

Continuation of construction approved, 2017
In November 2017 the Georgia Public Service Commission (GPSC) requested additional documentation following concerns that design blueprints had not been approved by appropriately licensed engineers, which has legal implications. On December 21, 2017, the PSC approved the continuation of construction on Units 3 and 4, with conditions that reduced the costs that can be recovered from ratepayers over the life of the project, causing a scheduled monthly consumer rate increase of $3.78 after first power.

In the February 2018 Vogtle Construction Monitoring Report (VCM), GPSC approved November 2021 and November 2022 as the target in-service dates for Units 3 & 4 respectively. The report notes that the project is being completed on an accelerated schedule and is currently tracking ahead of the 2021 & 2022 in-service target dates.

In August 2018 a $2.3 billion increase in costs was recognized. The total cost, including financing costs, is estimated at about $25 billion.
In September 2018, in order to sustain the project, Georgia Power agreed to pay an additional proportion of the costs of the smaller project partners if the cost of completion went beyond $9.2 billion.

In March 2019 further federal loan guarantees of $3.7 billion were given to the various build partners, taking total federal loan guarantees up to $12 billion. The Georgia Power CEO said the loan guarantees played a key role in reducing financing costs for the build. Also in March 2019, Georgia Power confirmed that the Unit 3 containment cap had been lowered into place and the reactor would be ready to load nuclear fuel in 2020. This was preceded by the containment vessel third ring, as well as reactor coolant pump and polar crane installation in unit 3 during 2018 and 2019. The containment vessel top head was set during a site visit by Secretary of Energy Rick Perry and executives of the plant's owners. Recent progress on unit 4 includes the installation of the final steam generator and pressurizer. Unit 4 is being constructed utilizing lessons learned from Unit 3 and from the failed Virgil C. Summer Nuclear Generating Station (V.C. Summer) project and as a result the order in which some components are being installed has been modified. On November 22, 2019 the third ring of the containment vessel was set for unit 4, and on December 8, 2019 the unit 3 shield building roof was set above the unit 3 containment vessel. On December 16, 2019 the control room of unit 3 became operational and is now available for testing systems. On February 11, 2020, Southern Nuclear announced that the final concrete placement inside the Unit 3 containment vessel was completed which will allow installation of the reactor's fueling machine. As of February 2020, assembly continues on the final top most vertical feature of the overall Unit 3 reactor building, the passive containment cooling system storage tank, which will be set on top of the Shield Building Roof.

A three month delay to completion of both units was announced in October 2021, with unit 3 expected operational in the third quarter of 2022 and unit 4 in the second quarter of 2023. In August 2022 a further delay was announced, first quarter of 2023 for unit 3 and the fourth quarter of 2023 for unit 4. Costs were expected to rise to over $30 billion due to the delays.

Commissioning process 

On October 14, 2022, It was announced that Vogtle Unit 3 had begun loading nuclear fuel.
In this process, technicians from Southern Nuclear and Westinghouse work together on the transferring of 157 fuel assemblies from the fuel pool to the reactor one at a time. Once this process is completed, the startup testing phase begins, where the integrity of the primary coolant system and steam systems is verified, and their functioning at design tempratures and pressures is ensured. Operators will also bring the units from a cold start to first criticality, where a sustained chain reaction is achieved. The unit will then be synchronized to the electric grid, as power is systematically raised to 100%. Vogtle Unit 3 was projected to enter service in the first quarter of 2023.

During start-up and pre-operational testing in February of 2023 the plant's cooling system suffered from unexpected vibrations. Measures were taken to remedy the problem. Additional minor issues are also under investigation. The time-plan has been set back so that the begin of regular service is expected for May or June of 2023. On March 6, 2023, Vogtle Unit 3 reached initial criticality for the first time.

Surrounding population

The 2010 U.S. population within  of Vogtle was 5,845, a decrease of 16.3 percent in a decade, according to an analysis of U.S. Census data for msnbc.com. The 2010 U.S. population within  was 726,640, an increase of 8.8 percent since 2000. Cities within  include Augusta, GA ( to city center).

Seismic risk
The Nuclear Regulatory Commission's estimate of the risk each year of an earthquake intense enough to cause core damage to either reactor at Vogtle was 1 in 140,845, according to an NRC study published in August 2010.

See also
List of largest power stations in the United States

Olkiluoto Nuclear Power Plant

Virgil C. Summer Nuclear Generating Station

References

External links

Southern Company: Plant Vogtle Units 3 and 4
U.S. Department of Energy: Vogtle
NRC: Vogtle Electric Generating Plant, Unit 1
NRC: Vogtle Electric Generating Plant, Unit 2
NRC: Vogtle, Units 3 & 4 Application

Energy infrastructure completed in 1987
Energy infrastructure completed in 1989
Towers completed in 1987
Nuclear power stations using AP1000 reactors
Buildings and structures in Burke County, Georgia
Nuclear power stations with reactors under construction
Towers in Georgia (U.S. state)
Nuclear power plants in Georgia (U.S. state)
Nuclear power stations using pressurized water reactors
Georgia Power
Articles containing video clips
Oglethorpe Power